

Election date
 Elections come due July 26, 2013. However, as these elections are not part of the Trinidad & Tobago Constitution ; they can be delayed by Parliament . 
 October 21, 2013 has been announced as the date of the election. 
Nomination Day is 30 September 2013

Seats
 Seats are determined by the EBC ( Elections and Boundaries Commission ), in the 2010 elections there were 134 seats in 14 areas. In the 2013 election there will be 136 seats in 14 areas. Additionally, under the Municipal Corporations Amendment Act 2013, there will now be 4 aldermen in each of the 14 areas. Each party will be allocated aldermen based on proportional representation.

Results
The Elections and Boundaries Commission recorded the highest voter turnout in history for a local government election. Eight municipal corporations were won by the opposition People's National Movement, five municipal corporations were won by the ruling People's Partnership, and the Chaguanas Municipal Corporation was divided 3-3-2 between PNM, UNC and ILP respectively. An ILP councilor later crossed the floor, giving the UNC control of the Chaguanas Borough Corporation.

Regional Corporations won by the People's National Movement:

Port-Of-Spain: PNM 12, People's Partnership 0

San Fernando: PNM:8 COP:1

Arima: PNM 7, People's Partnership 0

Point Fortin: PNM 6, People's Partnership 0

Diego Martin: PNM 10, People's Partnership 0.

SanJuan/Laventille: PNM 12, People's Partnership 1.

Tunapuna/Piarco: PNM 12, People's Partnership 2, Independent Liberal Party 1.

Sangre Grande: PNM 5, People's Partnership 3

Regional Corporations won by the People's Partnership:

Mayaro/Rio Claro: People's Partnership 4, PNM 2.

Couva/Tabaquite/Talparo: People's Partnership 13, PNM 1

Penal/Debe: People's Partnership 9 PNM 1

Princes Town: People's Partnership 8, PNM 2

Siparia: People's Partnership 5, PNM 3

Chaguanas: PNM 3, People's Partnership 3, Independent Liberal Party 2.

References

2013 elections in the Caribbean
2013 in Trinidad and Tobago
2013